The Multi-Payload Processing Facility (MPPF) is a facility at Kennedy Space Center constructed by NASA in either 1994 or 1995 and used for spacecraft and payload processing. Prior to being assigned the role of processing the Orion spacecraft, the MPPF was used to process solely non-hazardous payloads.

Layout 

The interior of the primary MPPF building is divided into a low bay, high bay, and equipment airlock. 

The high bay is certified for the processing of hazardous materials such as high-pressure gasses, hypergolic propellant, ammonia, oxygen, and fluorocarbons. Both the high bay and low bay are class 100,000 cleanrooms. 

It is equipped with a  door.

Usage 
After its construction, the MPPF was used for the processing of both Space Shuttle and Launch Services Program payloads. Following the end of the Shuttle program in 2011, it is slated to process the Orion spacecraft, and is also available to process hazardous or non-hazardous Space Launch System (SLS) payloads if necessary.

Design work on upgrading the MPPF for Orion processing began in 2007 during the Constellation program, but actual installation and modification work only began in 2013.

Orion spacecraft processing will be performed by the Spacecraft and Offline Operations team while the SLS is being stacked on the Mobile Launcher in the Vehicle Assembly Building. During this time flight commodities will be loaded into the spacecraft. These flight commodities include monomethyl hydrazine fuel and nitrogen tetroxide oxidizer used in Orion's propulsion systems, ammonia coolant for thermal control, and Freon for the service module's radiator system. The MPPF will also be used to de-service Orion capsules that have returned from space and remove any residual flight commodities.

Due to the hazardous materials involved, loading and unloading of flight commodities will be remotely monitored and controlled from one of the firing rooms inside the Launch Control Center and performed by technicians wearing Self Contained Atmospheric Protective Ensemble (SCAPE) hazmat suits.

On January 16 2021, The Artemis 1 Orion spacecraft began fueling and pre-launch servicing in the MPPF following a handover to exploration ground systems.

Gallery

See also 

 Payload Hazardous Servicing Facility
 Space Station Processing Facility
 Orbiter Processing Facility

References

Notes

Citations

Sources

External links 
 Inside the Multi-Payload Processing Facility
 NASA KSC Multi-Payload Processing Facility
 Facilities Used for SLS and Orion

Kennedy Space Center